The Great Impostor is a 1961 American comedy-drama film movie based on the true story of an impostor named Ferdinand Waldo Demara.  The film is loosely based on Robert Crichton's 1959 biography of the same name, it stars Tony Curtis in the title role, and was directed by Robert Mulligan. The film only loosely follows Demara's real-life exploits, and is much lighter in tone than the book on which it is based.

Plot
As he is arrested by the Coast Guard on an island in New England, a man born as Ferdinand Waldo Demara but known by many other identities recalls the events that brought him to this point.

Demara quit high school as a boy and joined the Army. He wanted to become an officer, but his lack of education worked against it. On a whim, he fakes a set of credentials and becomes a U.S. Marine.

When his lie is detected, Demara, facing jail, fakes a suicide and hides out as a Trappist monk. After a while, he is expelled from the monastery, captured and imprisoned in a military brig. But the warden inadvertently confides too many details of his own life to Demara, taking a liking to him. Upon his release, Demara impersonates the warden and lands a job working in a Texas penitentiary, where he takes up with his new warden's daughter, Eulalie.

Blackmailed by an inmate who recognizes him from the military jail, Demara once again flees. He joins the Royal Canadian Navy, using the forged credentials of a doctor. After falling in love with a RCN Nursing Sister, Catherine Lacey, he goes to Korea to serve aboard  HMCS Cayuga. He ends up doing dental work on the ship's captain, then performing operations in a Korean hospital.

Hailed as a "miracle doctor," Demara gains publicity that exposes his past. The Navy finds out who he really is and intends to hold a court-martial. Nurse Lacey and others vow to testify on Demara's behalf, having seen his good side. Worried about possible disrepute to the RCN, and his stellar service, he is allowed to leave under a general discharge. He then goes and becomes a teacher in New England.

The FBI eventually comes up with an agent whose assignment is to track down the great impostor and capture him. In the end, the agent is revealed to be Demara himself.

Cast
 Tony Curtis as Demara
 Edmond O'Brien as Capt. Glover
 Gary Merrill as Pa Demara
 Karl Malden as Father Devlin
 Raymond Massey as the Abbot
 Joan Blackman as Catherine Lacey
 Arthur O'Connell as Warden Chandler
 Jeanette Nolan as Ma Demara
 Sue Ane Langdon as Eulalie
 Frank Gorshin as Barney
 Robert Middleton as Lt. Brown
 Cindi Wood as WAC Lieutenant
 Gage Clarke as Mr. Warren (uncredited)
 James Dobson as sailor (uncredited)

Awards
Nominee Best director - Directors Guild of America (Robert Mulligan)

Reception
A.H. Weiler of the New York Times said: "...the film is not a harebrained exaggeration of the facts. But the story, enhanced by the serio-comic talents of Tony Curtis in the title role, add up to an odd-ball, but engaging, movie. ...Variety, it's been pointed out, is the spice of life, and Demara's life, as presented here, appears to be spicy beyond compare, but the record backs our adventurer fully. ...Suffice it to say that Mr. Curtis, running this gamut of adventures, seriously as well as with a wink, contributes the necessary light touch that makes palatable this derring-do based on factual data."

See also
 List of American films of 1961
Catch Me If You Can, a 2002 movie starring Leonardo DiCaprio
The Pretender, a TV series

References

External links
 
 

1961 films
1961 comedy-drama films
1960s American films
1960s English-language films
American black-and-white films
American biographical films
American comedy-drama films
Biographical films about fraudsters
Films about con artists
Films based on biographies
Films directed by Robert Mulligan
Films scored by Henry Mancini
Universal Pictures films
Cultural depictions of fraudsters
Cultural depictions of American men